MYT may refer to:
  Codes coordinated for uniqueness within context of application and region:
  Mayotte (ISO 3166 country code)
 Malaysia Time (zone)
 Transportation systems:
 Aviation (international):
 MyTravel Airways (British airline; former ICAO code)
 (IATA code) airport in Myanmar (Myitkyina)
 Rail:
 Amtrak station in California (Monterey)
 National Rail station code Mytholmroyd railway station, England, 
 Youth organizations:
 Middlesbrough Youth Theatre,
 Milwaukee Youth Theatre,
 MYT,  type of swing-piston engine